Senator Judd may refer to:

Albert Francis Judd Jr. (1874–1939), Hawaiian territorial Senate
Norman B. Judd (1815–1878), Illinois State Senate
Stoddard Judd (1797–1873), Wisconsin State Senate